Palaeopalaemon is an extinct genus of the oldest lobster-like aquatic decapod crustaceans, containing the species Palaeopalaemon newberryi.

References

Decapods
Prehistoric crustacean genera
Fossil taxa described in 1880